Pushpaka Vimanam is a 2021 Indian Telugu-language comedy thriller film written and directed by Damodara and produced by Govardhan Rao Devarakonda, Vijay Mattapally and Pradeep Errabelly under the banners of King of the Hill Entertainment and Tanga Productions. The film stars Anand Devarakonda, Geeth Saini and Saanve Megghana. The film was released on 12 November 2021.

Plot
Chittilanka Sundar is a recently married teacher. After the marriage he is hopeful of a blissful life with his wife, but his expectations are shattered when she elopes with someone else. 

Feeling embarrassed he tries to hide this from his neighbours and colleagues and secretly searches for her. He questions her parents and friends to no avail. 

One day the colleagues of Sundar plans to visit his house to greet the newly married couple. So he hires an actor Rekha to pretend as his wife. They manage to pull it off though there are some hitches in the form of a noisy neighbour.

The headmaster of the school where Sundar works one day sees Rekha smoking with her friends and informs this to him. He also arranges to buy a new HD TV on behalf of the staff so that he can use the opportunity to counsel Rekha. 

There while browsing channels Sundar witnesses the news of Meenakshi's death. Feeling shocked and fearing the worst he goes to the mortuary and identifies the body. He then meets S.I. Rangam who primarily suspects Sundar as the culprit. 

Rangam, in his investigation, finds blood stains in Sundar's house which are later revealed to be Meenakshi's. Sundar also fails to prove Meenakshi eloped due to his earlier lies. Rangam suspects Rekha to be Sundar's accomplice. 

Rangam thrashes Sundar in the guise of interrogation to obtain the truth. During the 'interrogation' Sundar reveals the actual reason Meenakshi left him. 

During their first night together Sundar asks Meenakshi about her virginity, angering her. He later apologises to her but she doesn't respond to him. Things escalate when he tries to hit Meenakshi after she insulted his father. So Meenakshi leaves to her former boyfriend's house.

Her Post Mortem reveals the date of death to be tenth of the month and Sundar manages to provide partial alibi for the day prompting the police to release him. 

Sundar's neighbour, an aspiring musician, tries to console him. He claims that on the day of Meenakshi's death he has composed his career's best music and wasn't able to move from his chair. 

Rangam interrogates Meenakshi's ex-boyfriend and realizes that she left him after a huge fight. 

The Police then tries to arrest Sundar but he manages to escape. While on the run he finds out that Meenakshi stayed with her friend whom he had earlier visited. 

He rushes over to her house and learns that she planned to return to him on the day of her death. He investigates further and finds that his neighbour tried to assault her and by mistake killed her by pushing her.

SI Rangam takes the credit for solving the case and the story ends on a positive note with Sundar trying to move on with his life.

Cast 
 Anand Devarakonda as Chittilanka Sundar
 Geeth Saini as Meenakshi
 Saanve Megghana as Rekha
 Sunil as SI Rangam
 Naresh as School Headmaster
 Harsha Vardhan as Sundar's neighbour, a budding music director
Harsha Chemudu as Meenakshi's ex
Vajja Venkata Giridhar as Social teacher
Kireeti Damaraju as Abhi, Sundar's friend
Varsha Bollamma in a cameo appearance

Music 

Background score of the film was composed by Mark K Robin. 2 songs ("Kalyanam" and "Silakaa") were composed by Ram Miriyala, 2 songs ("Aaha" and "Malli Rava") were composed by Sidharth Sadasivuni, 1 song ("Swamy Ra Ra (Krishna Shabdam)") was composed by Amit N Dasani and 1 song ("Chori Chori Dekho Rey") was composed by Mark K Robin.

Reception 
The film received mixed reviews from critics. Neeshita Nyayapati of The Times Of India gave the film a rating of 3 out of 5 and wrote "Pushpaka Vimanam is by no means the perfect dark comedy it sets out to be, especially when films in a similar genre have already done better in Telugu. But watch it this weekend if you’re game for a quirky film with a pinch of comedy, spoon-full of twists and a stellar cast to back it all up". Gabbeta Ranjith Kumar of The Indian Express stated "Anand Deverakonda's performance adds value to this part-comedy, part-investigative drama".

The New Indian Express' Ram Venkat Srikar rated the film 3/5 felt it was an "enjoyable comedy that doubles up as a whodunit." 
Reviewing the film for The Hindu, Sangeetha Devi Dundoo concluded that "There are all interesting ideas, but the narrative doesn’t bring everything together in an engrossing manner. A better screenplay might have helped make Pushpaka Vimanam a quirky black comedy it intended to be. It’s not a bad film, it isn’t great either."

References

External links 
 
2021 films
2020s Telugu-language films
Indian comedy-drama films
2021 comedy-drama films
Films set in Hyderabad, India
Films shot in Hyderabad, India
Films scored by Ram Miriyala